Denys Olehovych Byelousov (born 6 November 1996) is a Ukrainian professional footballer who plays as a right winger for Ahrobiznes Volochysk.

Career

Early years
Byelousov is a product of the LVUFK Luhansk youth sportive school.

Zorya Luhansk
In 2013 he signed a contract with Ukrainian Zorya Luhansk and played in the Ukrainian Premier League Reserves until 2017.

Avanhard Kramatorsk
In August 2017 he signed a one-year contract with Avanhard Kramatorsk in the Ukrainian First League. He made his debut as a start-squad player for Avanhard Kramatorsk in the Ukrainian First League in the match against Poltava on 5 August 2017.

References

External links

1996 births
Living people
Footballers from Luhansk
Ukrainian footballers
Ukraine youth international footballers
Association football forwards
FC Zorya Luhansk players
FC Kramatorsk players
FC Kremin Kremenchuk players
FC Myr Hornostayivka players
FC Metalurh Zaporizhzhia players
FC Ahrobiznes Volochysk players
Ukrainian First League players
Ukrainian Second League players